Harinavi DVAS High School is a government administrated high school in the Rajpur Sonarpur of the South 24 Parganas district in the Indian state of West Bengal.

Notable alumni 
Suvendra Nath Bhattacharyya, Shanti Swarup Bhatnagar laureate
Salil Choudhury, an Indian songwriter, music director, lyricist, writer, and poet who predominantly composed for Bengali, Hindi, and Malayalam films.

References

Boys' schools in India
Schools in Colonial India
High schools and secondary schools in West Bengal
Schools in South 24 Parganas district
Educational institutions established in 1866
1866 establishments in India